The 1904 Montana football team represented the University of Montana in the 1904 college football season. They were led by second-year head coach Hiram Conibear, and finished the season with a record of three wins and two losses (3–2).

Schedule

References

Montana
Montana Grizzlies football seasons
Montana football